Oskar Kwiatkowski  (born 25 April 1996) is a Polish snowboarder.
 
He made his international debut in 2012 in Kreischberg. In 2013, he won silver medal in the parallel giant slalom at the European Youth Olympic Winter Festival in Predeal, Romania. 

In 2015, he finished 5th at the FIS Snowboarding Junior World Championships in Yabuli, China.

He competed in the 2017 FIS Snowboard World Championships, and in the 2018 Winter Olympics, in parallel giant slalom.

He claimed 13th place in the parallel giant slalom at the 2018 Winter Olympic Games in Pyeongchang.

In February 2023, he won a gold medal at the Snowboarding World Championships in Bakuriani, Georgia, in the parallel giant slalom, becoming the first Pole ever to win a world championship in alpine snowboarding.

References

External links

1996 births
Living people
Polish male snowboarders
Olympic snowboarders of Poland
Snowboarders at the 2018 Winter Olympics
Snowboarders at the 2022 Winter Olympics
Sportspeople from Zakopane
Universiade gold medalists for Poland
Universiade silver medalists for Poland
Universiade medalists in snowboarding
Competitors at the 2017 Winter Universiade
Competitors at the 2019 Winter Universiade
21st-century Polish people